Halifax Community College is a public community college in Weldon, a town in Halifax County in North Carolina. Established in 1967, the college is one of the oldest in the North Carolina Community College System. It offers associate degree programs and continuing education.

History
Halifax Community College was chartered on September 7, 1967, as Halifax County Technical Institute, part of the North Carolina Community College System. It began operations in
February 1968 under Phillip W. Taylor, and from June 1968 to April 1977 was located at the old
Colonial Manor Hotel property on Highway 301. The current 109-acre campus, centrally located on Highway 158 in Weldon, was purchased in 1972, built in 1975, 1976 and 1977, and dedicated on May 22, 1977.

In 1971, a general education program was added, by contract with East Carolina University.
After several years of study, and following legislative approval in 1975, Halifax County Technical Institute added two-year transfer programs to become a comprehensive community college.
On July 1, 1976, the Institute's name officially changed to Halifax Community College.

Growth in enrollment has been accompanied by growth in facilities, including centers for continuing education, wellness, child care, allied health, literacy/science education, nursing, and student services, as well as The Centre at Halifax Community College, a 1500-seat multipurpose theater and conference facility that opened in November 2003.

The fourth and current president, Ervin V. Griffin, Sr., took office December 1, 2006.

Accreditation
Halifax Community College is accredited by the Southern Association of Colleges and Schools. The college and its programs are also accredited or approved by the following agencies:

Academics

Harriet Morrison is Dean of Curriculum Programs and academic programs are grouped into six schools:

School of Arts and Sciences
School of Business
School of Legal and Public Service
School of Vocational and Industrial Technology
School of Nursing and Allied Health
Adult and continuing education programs

See also
 University of North Carolina System
 List of colleges and universities in North Carolina

References

External links
 Official website

Two-year colleges in the United States
North Carolina Community College System colleges
Education in Halifax County, North Carolina
Educational institutions established in 1959
Universities and colleges accredited by the Southern Association of Colleges and Schools
Buildings and structures in Halifax County, North Carolina
1959 establishments in North Carolina